My Own United States is a 1918 American silent drama film directed by John W. Noble and starring Arnold Daly, Charles E. Graham, and Duncan McRae. It is based on the short story The Man Without a Country by Edward Everett Hale. It was distributed by Metro Pictures.

The original story, with its strong patriotic theme, was written during the American Civil War in order to increase public support for the Union cause; the film had a like function with regard to World War I, in which the United States was deeply involved at the time.

Plot
As described in a film magazine, Philip Noloan (Daly) is a young American who entertains pacifist views about the American entry into World War I because of his selfish desire to maintain his own comfort. His father, to arouse his duty to his country, tells him the tragic story of his ancestor the first Philip Nolan's (Daly) treason by relating the incidents from the story The Man Without a Country. His father then tells of incidents from the American Civil War where a later ancestor, also named Philip Nolan (Daly), did all he could to wipe the stain of that treason from the family name. At the conclusion, Philip has become so thrilled by the great deeds of his family that he rises to the occasion and offers his services to his country to make the world safe for democracy.

Cast

 Arnold Daly as Lt. Philip Nolan I, II, III, IV 
 Charles E. Graham as Col. Aaron Burr
 Duncan McRae as Gen. Alexander Hamilton 
 Sidney Bracey as Capt. Rene Gautier 
 P.R. Scammon as President Thomas Jefferson
 Thomas Donnelly as Gen. George Churchill 
 John Levering as Justice Col. George Morgan 
 Eddie Dunn as Gen. Wilkinson
 Claude Cooper as William Bayard 

 William V. Miller as Mr. Van Ness 
 Frederick Truesdell as Mr. Pendleton 
 F.C. Earle as Andrew Jackson
 Mary Carr as Mrs. Alexander Hamilton
 Shorty Hamilton as Lt. Gaines
 Richard Wangermann as Dr. Hossack
 Fred Herzog as Adm. Stephen Decatur
 Anna Lehr as Agnes Churchill

Reception
Like many American films of the time, My Own United States was subject to cuts by city and state film censorship boards. For example, the Chicago Board of Censors cut, in Reel 3, the shooting in the duel and changed the Lincoln quotation to read "Let us have faith that Right makes Might".

References

External links

1918 films
1918 drama films
Silent American drama films
1910s English-language films
Films directed by John W. Noble
American black-and-white films
American silent feature films
Metro Pictures films
1910s American films